Dylan Thomas is a 1962 short documentary film directed by Jack Howells about the Welsh poet and writer, Dylan Thomas. It won an Oscar at the 35th Academy Awards in 1963 for Documentary Short Subject. The Academy Film Archive preserved Dylan Thomas in 2000.

Cast
 Richard Burton as Himself

See also
 Dylan Thomas
 Richard Burton filmography

References

External links
 

1962 films
1962 documentary films
1962 independent films
1962 short films
1960s short documentary films
British short documentary films
Best Documentary Short Subject Academy Award winners
British independent films
British black-and-white films
Documentary films about poets
Cultural depictions of Dylan Thomas
1960s English-language films
1960s British films